The Art Dealer (French title: L'Antiquaire) is a 2015 French thriller drama film produced and directed by François Margolin. The film is about a young woman's quest to recover the collection of paintings stolen from her Jewish family during the Second World War. It was released in France on 18 March 2015.

Cast 
 Anna Sigalevitch as Esther 
 Michel Bouquet as Raoul 
 Robert Hirsch as Claude Weinstein 
 François Berléand as Simon  
 Louis-Do de Lencquesaing as Melchior  
 Adam Sigalevitch as Gaspard  
 Alice de Lencquesaing as Jeanne   
 Niels Schneider as Klaus    
 Benjamin Siksou as Jean  
 Fabienne Babe as Fabienne 
 Christophe Bourseiller as Hurtado   
 Olga Grumberg as The Editor
 Lolita Chammah as Sophie

References

External links 
 

2015 films
2015 thriller drama films
2010s French-language films
French thriller drama films
French independent films
2015 independent films
2015 drama films
2010s French films